Monument Valley High School is located in Oljato-Monument Valley, Utah. The school is in the San Juan School District, and serves grades 7–12. It is different from Monument Valley High School located in Kayenta, Arizona.

References

External links
Monument Valley High School website
San Juan School District website

Public high schools in Utah
Schools in San Juan County, Utah